Brittany Rae Pereda (born August 14, 1990) is an American softball player. She attended Orange Lutheran High School in Orange, California. She later attended Loyola Marymount University, where she played college softball for the Loyola Marymount Lions softball team. Pereda later served as an assistant softball coach and as an assistant athletic director at Concordia University Irvine in Irvine, California.

References

External links
Loyola Marymount bio
Concordia University Irvine bio

1990 births
American softball players
Loyola Marymount Lions athletes
Living people
Sportspeople from Orange, California
Softball players from California
Concordia Eagles softball coaches